The 7th Central Military Commission of the Workers' Party of Korea (WPK)(7차 조선로동당 중앙군사위원회), officially the Central Military Commission of the 7th Central Committee of the Workers' Party of Korea, was elected at the 1st Plenary Session of the 7th WPK Central Committee in the immediate aftermath of the party's 7th Congress on 9  May 2016.

Composition
 Chairman Kim Jong-un
 Hwang Pyong-so
 Pak Pong-ju
 Pak Yong-sik
 Ri Myong-su
 Kim Yong-chol
 Ri Man-gon
 Kim Won-hong
 Choe Pu-il
 Kim Kyong-ok
 Ri Yong-gil
 So Hong-chan

References

7th Central Military Commission of the Workers' Party of Korea